The FC Basel 1924–25 season was their thirty second season since the club's foundation on 15 November 1893. The club's chairman was Karl Ibach in his third season as chairman in his second period as chairman. FC Basel played their home games in the Landhof in the district Wettstein in Kleinbasel.

Overview 
Gustav Putzendopler was team captain this season and as captain he led the team trainings and was responsible for the line-ups. Basel played a total of 28 matches in their 1924–25 season. 16 of these were in the domestic league, and 12 were friendly matches. Of these 12 friendlies only two were played at home in the Landhof and 10 were away games, seven in Switzerland, one in Strasbourg and two in Zagreb. Only two test games ended with a victory, the other ten all ended with a defeat. In these tests Basel scored just 11 goals but they conceded 34.

This season the Serie A was again divided into three regional groups, East, Central and West, each group with nine teams. Basel were allocated to the Central group together with the other teams from the city Concordia Basel, Nordstern Basel and Old Boys Basel. The further teams allocated to this group were Young Boys Bern, FC Bern, Aarau, Luzern and the newly promoted FC Grenchen. The team that won each group would continue to the finals and the last placed team in the group had to play a barrage against relegation.

Basel started their season well, only being defeated once in their first eleven games. They were always up with the table leaders, however at the end of the season three defeats against the other leading teams Aarau, Old Boys and lastly FC Bern, cost them their place at the top of the table. The team finished in fourth position, four points behind FC Bern, one point behind Aarau and level with Old Boys. During their league season Basel won seven of their matches, drawing five and were defeated four times. In their 16 league matches the team scored just 13 goals (the first game of the season ended 1–0, but later awarded 3–0). FC Bern won the central group and advanced to the finals. West group winners Servette won the championship, Bern were runners-up and east group winners Young Fellows Zürich were third. Luzern were last in the central group. They thus played the promotion-relegation barrage against Solothurn. Solothurn achieved promotion, Luzern were relegated.

Emil Breh was Basel’s top league goal scorer with seven goals. Breh had joined the team before the season started and left the club at the end of it. Ernst Zorzotti was the teams second top scorer with just two goals. Four players each scored one goal, Karl Bielser, Arthur Fahr, Hans Rau and Hans Schneider. The other two goal scorers were not recorded.

Players 
Squad members

Results 

Legend

Friendly matches

Pre- and mid-season

Notes

Winter break, mid- and end of season

Serie A

Central group results 

Notes

Central group table

See also 
 History of FC Basel
 List of FC Basel players
 List of FC Basel seasons

References

Sources 
 Rotblau: Jahrbuch Saison 2014/2015. Publisher: FC Basel Marketing AG. 
 Die ersten 125 Jahre. Publisher: Josef Zindel im Friedrich Reinhardt Verlag, Basel. 
 FCB team 1924–25 at fcb-archiv.ch
 Switzerland 1924-25 at RSSSF

External links
 FC Basel official site

FC Basel seasons
Basel